North Carolina Highway 127 (NC 127) is a primary state highway in the U.S. state of North Carolina.  It serves similar to a farm-to-market highway, connecting rural Catawba and Alexander counties to Hickory.

Route description
NC 127 is a rural two-lane highway, except in Hickory. It begins at an intersection with NC 10 in the unincorporated Catawba County community of Propst Crossroads and travels north over Jacobs Fork into the census designated place (CDP) of Mountain View. In Mountain View, NC 127 has an interchange with US 321 which provides access to Interstate 40. Following this interchange, the highway enters the town of Brookford, North Carolina and is named Brookford Boulevard. Upon entering Hickory, NC 127 passes over I-40 and US 70/US 321 Business without interchanges. As NC 127 winds into Hickory as a four-lane undivided road, it remains unnamed until it reaches its intersection with 1st Avenue NE where it becomes known as 2nd Street NE.

Heading north through Hickory, NC 127 passes near the Frye Regional Medical Center, Lenoir–Rhyne University, and Hickory High School. The highway is four lanes with a center turn lane throughout the northern sections of Hickory. The highway shrinks to two-lanes wide before crossing the Catawba River into Alexander County and the CDP of Bethlehem. After passing through Bethlehem, the road becomes more winding as it heads into hillier terrain. NC 127 ends at an unsignalized intersection with US 64/NC 90 in the community of Ellendale.

History
Established as a renumbering of NC 96 in 1940; the overall routing has not changed, but has changed roads through Hickory several times.

Junction list

References

127
Transportation in Catawba County, North Carolina
Transportation in Alexander County, North Carolina